, son of regent Sanetsune, was a kugyō or Japanese court noble of the Kamakura period (1185–1333). He held a regent position sesshō from 1274 to 1275. Uchitsune was his son.

Family
 Father: Ichijo Sanetsune
 Mother: Bomon Arinobu's daughter
 Wives:
 Matsudono Yoshitsugu's daughter
 daughter of Sono Motouji
 Taira Takamochi's daughter
 Fujiwara Chikanari's daughter
 Children:
 Ichijo Uchisane by Matsudono Yoshitsugu's daughter
 Ichijo Kanetsune by Matsudono Yoshitsugu's daughter
 Ichijo Iefusa (1270-?) by daughter of Sono Motouji
 Genka by Taira Takamochi's daughter
 Jibuka (d.1348) by Fujiwara Chikanari's daughter
 Jinkaku (d.1353)
 Dosai
 Dosho (1281-1356)
 Ryokei (1291-1360)
 Kegen

References
 

1248 births
1293 deaths
Fujiwara clan
Ichijō family
People of Kamakura-period Japan